Albert Leonard "Mick" Michael (January 1912 – 7 November 1987) was a British philatelist who was added to the Roll of Distinguished Philatelists in 1978.

Michael's first employment in the stamp trade was with H.E. Wingfield, a firm which he eventually owned. In 1962 Wingfield joined with Stanley Gibbons and Michael became joint managing director of that firm and chairman six years later. He retired in 1989.

References

Signatories to the Roll of Distinguished Philatelists
1912 births
1987 deaths
British philatelists
British stamp dealers